John Rocque (originally Jean; c. 1704–1762) was a French-born British surveyor and cartographer, best known for his detailed map of London published in 1746.

Life and career
Rocque was born in France in about 1704, one of four children of a Huguenot family who subsequently fled first to Geneva, and then, probably in 1709, to England. He became a godfather in 1728, which suggests he was at least twenty-one years old by that time.

In addition to his work as surveyor and mapmaker, Rocque was an engraver and map-seller. He was also involved in some way in gardening as a young man, living with his brother Bartholomew, who was a landscape gardener, and producing plans for parterres, perhaps recording pre-existing designs, but few details of this work are known. Rocque produced engraved plans of the gardens at Wrest Park (1735), Claremont (1738), Charles Hamilton's naturalistic landscape garden at Painshill Park, Surrey (1744), Wanstead House (1745) and Wilton House (1746).

Rocque is now remembered principally for his Map of London. He began work on this in 1737 and it was published in 24 printed sheets in 1746. It was by far the most detailed map of London published up to that time, and remains an important historical resource.

The map of London and his other maps brought him an appointment as cartographer to Frederick, Prince of Wales in 1751. A fire in 1750 destroyed his premises and stock, but by 1753 he was employing ten draughtsmen, and The Small British Atlas: Being a New set of Maps of all the Counties of England and Wales appeared. There was a second edition in 1762.

He also surveyed and published maps of Middlesex, Oxford, Berkshire, & Buckinghamshire in 1760.

Time in Dublin
Rocque spent six years in Dublin (1754–60), where he produced a number of maps of the Irish capital, as well as county maps of Dublin and Armagh, city maps of Kilkenny and Cork, and a series of sumptuously illustrated manuscript surveys of the estates of the then Earl of Kildare. In 1756, he published the first detailed printed map of Dublin, the 4-sheet Exact Survey of Dublin (officially entitled An Exact Survey of the City and Suburbs of Dublin in Which is Express'd the Ground Plot of all Publick Buildings Dwelling Houses Ware Houses Stables Courts Yards &c by John Rocque Chorographer to their Royal Highnesses The Late & Present Prince of Wales - 1756). A detail from this map later featured on the Irish Series B ten pound banknote (1976–1993). 

Rocque also covered the hinterland of Dublin in A Survey of the City Harbour Bay and Environs of Dublin, published in four sheets in 1758. These extended as far as Skerries and Cardy Rocks to the north, Carton House to the west, Blessington to the south-west and Enniskerry to the south.

Personal life
Rocque married twice. His widow, Mary Ann Rocque, continued the business after his death.

References

Further reading

External links

A detailed biography
Rocque's map of London online
Rocque's clickable map post-road of Europe
Rocque's Exact Survey of Dublin 1756
Rocque's 1758 Harbour & Environs map online
A Set of Plans and Forts in America, Reduced From Actual Survey. John Rocque. This 1763 volume contains drawings of 29 British forts in colonial America (now Canada and the United States).  Digitized by the New York State Library.

English cartographers
1762 deaths
Year of birth uncertain
Year of birth unknown
18th-century cartographers
18th-century English people
English surveyors
Huguenots